South Cotabato's 3rd congressional district is an obsolete congressional district that encompassed the Sarangani Bay region, a former territory of South Cotabato. It was represented in the House of Representatives from its creation under the ordinance annex of the 1987 Constitution of the Philippines that divided the province into three congressional districts, until 1995. The district was dissolved following the ratification of Sarangani's organic law of March 1992 which elected its own provincial at-large representative beginning in May 1995.

Representation history

See also
Legislative districts of South Cotabato

References

Former congressional districts of the Philippines
Politics of South Cotabato
History of Sarangani
1987 establishments in the Philippines
1995 disestablishments in the Philippines
Congressional districts of Soccsksargen
Constituencies established in 1987
Constituencies disestablished in 1992